Alice Klein is the co-founder and former owner of Toronto's longest-running free alternative newsweekly NOW Magazine. In 1981, Klein co-founded NOW with Michael Hollett and several others. It is now one of the largest independent media organizations in Canada.

Klein is also on the Board of the Toronto Arts Council, Canadian Journalists for Free Expression, Centre for Social Innovation and is a founding member of Green Enterprise Toronto (GET).

Biography
Alice Klein attended York University where she became involved with the university newspaper, Excalibur during the mid-1970s. Klein was active in left-wing politics during this period and was a member of the Socialist League. Klein met her future husband Michael Hollett during her years at York.

In 2007, Klein wrote, directed and produced her first documentary feature film The Call of the Hummingbird about a group of more than 1000 Mayan calendar (13 moon calendar) followers, bio-regionalists, and permaculture experts who gather in central Brazil to prepare and train for 21 December 2012 – the end of the Mayan calendar. The film was screened at SXSW and Hot Docs and at numerous other international film festivals.

In 2016, Klein became the sole proprietor of the newspaper after Hollett sold his share of Now Communications to Klein and left the newspaper to focus on North by Northeast as the festival's president and founder.

In 2019, Klein's NOW Communications sold NOW to Media Central Corporation for $2 million. Klein remained with the newspaper as "Chief Editorial Strategist".

References

External links
Now Magazine
The Call of the Hummingbird
Alice Klein.org

Canadian women journalists
Canadian magazine publishers (people)
Journalists from Toronto
Living people
Canadian newspaper editors
Women newspaper editors
Writers from Toronto
Canadian women non-fiction writers
Year of birth missing (living people)